Nethy may refer to:

Nethy Bridge, village in Strathspey in the Highland council area of Scotland
River Nethy, right bank tributary of the River Spey

See also

Netty (disambiguation)